On 12 May 2016, militants of the Al Qaeda-linked Al-Nusra Front and Ahrar ash-Sham attacked and captured the Alawite village of Zara'a, Southern Hama Governorate.

The attack
An early morning surprise attack on Zara'a defeated a National Defence Forces unit stationed there, and allowed the rebels to enter the predominantly Alawite village. The Syrian Observatory for Human Rights confirmed that civilians had been kidnapped and the Red Crescent confirmed that 42 children and seven NDF militiamen were killed during the militant attack. According to the LCCS, rebels killed over 30 pro-government fighters while SOHR said seven militants were killed. More clashes continued into the afternoon with the Syrian and Russian Air Forces airstriking the rebel positions. This rebel attack was a part of an assault in "revenge for Aleppo."

Aftermath
Civilians, including women and children, were kidnapped and taken to Al-Rastan Plains with some news sources putting the number kidnapped at 70. Some of the captured were pro-government troops. On 24 May 2016, the Syrian Red Crescent convinced the militants to hand over civilians and NDF bodies. They were transported by the Syrian Army to the Homs Military Hospital for identification the next day.

Reactions
: Prime Minister Wael Nader al-Halqi said that the massacre was "a heinous crime against the whole world." He also mentioned that "the international community must stand by Syria in fighting terrorism and should take immediate steps to prevent the countries which support terrorism from supplying terrorists with arms and money, on top Qatar, Saudi Arabia and Turkey."

The Syrian Foreign Ministry also sent two letters where they called on the UN Secretary-General and the UN Security Council to condemn the massacre.

: A French MP and president of the France-Syria Friendship Group in the National Assembly, Gérard Bapt condemned the murder of Alawite families in Zara'a. He added that "the recent initiative to officially add Ahrar ash-Sham and Jaysh al-Islam to the list of terrorist organizations was not supported by the UN Security Council due to the fact that five Western countries have disagreed." He further said "[We] must take the appropriate measures in Riyadh and within the framework of the High Negotiation Committee in Vienna to ensure the immediate liberation of civilians who were taken hostage."

See also
 List of massacres during the Syrian Civil War

References

Mass murder in 2016
Massacres of the Syrian civil war in 2016
Terrorist incidents in Syria in 2016
Massacres of the Syrian civil war perpetrated by the al-Nusra Front
Hama Governorate
May 2016 crimes in Asia
May 2016 events in Syria
Persecution of Alawites